The Kipsigis or Kipsigiis are a Nilotic tribe in Kenya. They are contingent of the Kalenjin ethnic group and speak Kipsigis language, a tonal language which is closely related to a group of languages collectively known as Kalenjin language. It is observed that the Kipsigis and an aboriginal race native to Kenya known as Ogiek have a merged identity. The Kipsigis are the most numerous of the Kalenjin. The latest Census population in Kenya put the kipsigis at 1.972 Million speakers accounting for 45% of all kalenjin speaking people (both in Kenya and Uganda). They occupy the highlands of Kericho stretching from Timboroa to Mara River in the south, the west of Mau Escarpment in the east to Kebeneti in the west. They also occupy, parts of Laikipia, Kitale, Nakuru, Narok, Trans Mara District, Eldoret and Nandi Hills.

Earlier impressions depict the Kipsigis as having 'beautiful' Caucasian physique and high positive regard, often declining tedious manual labour although they would condescend to shepherding cattle, proving invaluable at that and with lack of fear for the maraunding lions. Most Kipsigis are reputable for attributes including: humility, hardship endurance and strong emotional expressions. They are also characterized as loyal and courageous people. The kipsigis are among the most hospitable and courteous ethnic groups of Kenya.  Apart from the Kalenjin, the other tribe in this group is the Tatonga of Western Tanzania. In their expansion Southwards, the Kipsigis and the Tatonga people reached present-day Shinyanga Area in Western Tanzania only for the former group to return to the Kericho area before some went back again going Southwards but could only settle at Angata Barigoi in Trans Mara next to the Tanzanian Border.{
  "type": "FeatureCollection",
  "features": [
    {
      "type": "Feature",
      "properties": {},
      "geometry": {
        "type": "Polygon",
        "coordinates": [
          [
            [
              35.592785,
              -0.371987
            ],
            [
              35.580597,
              -0.391383
            ],
            [
              35.585403,
              -0.404945
            ],
            [
              35.59227,
              -0.407861
            ],
            [
              35.705395,
              -0.360498
            ],
            [
              35.720158,
              -0.365464
            ],
            [
              35.733376,
              -0.357398
            ],
            [
              35.735092,
              -0.36856
            ],
            [
              35.74419,
              -0.378515
            ],
            [
              35.761185,
              -0.376966
            ],
            [
              35.824356,
              -0.367356
            ],
            [
              35.868301,
              -0.370789
            ],
            [
              35.888901,
              -0.376968
            ],
            [
              35.91259,
              -0.410094
            ],
            [
              35.928469,
              -0.409494
            ],
            [
              35.965891,
              -0.419538
            ],
            [
              35.979195,
              -0.472921
            ],
            [
              36.054039,
              -0.557723
            ],
            [
              36.046314,
              -0.570593
            ],
            [
              36.034641,
              -0.580033
            ],
            [
              36.009579,
              -0.569395
            ],
            [
              35.974216,
              -0.555152
            ],
            [
              35.946579,
              -0.558578
            ],
            [
              35.933189,
              -0.55034
            ],
            [
              35.905724,
              -0.547592
            ],
            [
              35.891304,
              -0.526652
            ],
            [
              35.854225,
              -0.505026
            ],
            [
              35.833626,
              -0.492308
            ],
            [
              35.837746,
              -0.468623
            ],
            [
              35.830193,
              -0.465878
            ],
            [
              35.827103,
              -0.474459
            ],
            [
              35.816803,
              -0.473773
            ],
            [
              35.817146,
              -0.464854
            ],
            [
              35.811653,
              -0.4573
            ],
            [
              35.797234,
              -0.457645
            ],
            [
              35.795174,
              -0.46777
            ],
            [
              35.79586,
              -0.47344
            ],
            [
              35.780411,
              -0.51326
            ],
            [
              35.776291,
              -0.522872
            ],
            [
              35.773544,
              -0.537975
            ],
            [
              35.747108,
              -0.531796
            ],
            [
              35.736809,
              -0.531455
            ],
            [
              35.721016,
              -0.55205
            ],
            [
              35.711746,
              -0.55514
            ],
            [
              35.712433,
              -0.564409
            ],
            [
              35.71312,
              -0.573678
            ],
            [
              35.707283,
              -0.590841
            ],
            [
              35.694237,
              -0.600454
            ],
            [
              35.685997,
              -0.619334
            ],
            [
              35.685654,
              -0.639244
            ],
            [
              35.678444,
              -0.657093
            ],
            [
              35.670891,
              -0.65984
            ],
            [
              35.662994,
              -0.677004
            ],
            [
              35.639648,
              -0.701713
            ],
            [
              35.606689,
              -0.675642
            ],
            [
              35.59845,
              -0.637179
            ],
            [
              35.572357,
              -0.630325
            ],
            [
              35.549011,
              -0.587759
            ],
            [
              35.450478,
              -0.591708
            ],
            [
              35.488586,
              -0.549288
            ],
            [
              35.491333,
              -0.484752
            ],
            [
              35.467987,
              -0.447675
            ],
            [
              35.451508,
              -0.402362
            ],
            [
              35.450134,
              -0.359794
            ],
            [
              35.474854,
              -0.33508
            ],
            [
              35.48996,
              -0.293885
            ],
            [
              35.533905,
              -0.295257
            ],
            [
              35.57785,
              -0.302114
            ],
            [
              35.60257,
              -0.274661
            ],
            [
              35.625916,
              -0.287017
            ],
            [
              35.638275,
              -0.273285
            ],
            [
              35.64497,
              -0.272769
            ],
            [
              35.65012,
              -0.268992
            ],
            [
              35.65321,
              -0.260409
            ],
            [
              35.653553,
              -0.250283
            ],
            [
              35.659561,
              -0.244103
            ],
            [
              35.651665,
              -0.235521
            ],
            [
              35.652866,
              -0.226595
            ],
            [
              35.656643,
              -0.213719
            ],
            [
              35.652351,
              -0.210801
            ],
            [
              35.649433,
              -0.205993
            ],
            [
              35.659561,
              -0.199813
            ],
            [
              35.660248,
              -0.193977
            ],
            [
              35.652008,
              -0.194325
            ],
            [
              35.649261,
              -0.178534
            ],
            [
              35.634155,
              -0.173722
            ],
            [
              35.613556,
              -0.2005
            ],
            [
              35.612869,
              -0.221783
            ],
            [
              35.590897,
              -0.22247
            ],
            [
              35.568237,
              -0.229335
            ],
            [
              35.553818,
              -0.227278
            ],
            [
              35.53442,
              -0.252169
            ],
            [
              35.524979,
              -0.273283
            ],
            [
              35.505409,
              -0.272254
            ],
            [
              35.472965,
              -0.278607
            ],
            [
              35.458202,
              -0.286502
            ],
            [
              35.444813,
              -0.293883
            ],
            [
              35.423012,
              -0.298861
            ],
            [
              35.414257,
              -0.304182
            ],
            [
              35.408421,
              -0.310876
            ],
            [
              35.403271,
              -0.306243
            ],
            [
              35.366192,
              -0.348477
            ],
            [
              35.372028,
              -0.36203
            ],
            [
              35.383701,
              -0.359456
            ],
            [
              35.396061,
              -0.352762
            ],
            [
              35.395718,
              -0.36306
            ],
            [
              35.399666,
              -0.363576
            ],
            [
              35.391941,
              -0.368039
            ],
            [
              35.384731,
              -0.372845
            ],
            [
              35.38353,
              -0.376106
            ],
            [
              35.360012,
              -0.37027
            ],
            [
              35.349197,
              -0.376107
            ],
            [
              35.338898,
              -0.378683
            ],
            [
              35.336151,
              -0.394129
            ],
            [
              35.321388,
              -0.41164
            ],
            [
              35.318298,
              -0.41885
            ],
            [
              35.311432,
              -0.423313
            ],
            [
              35.314178,
              -0.435502
            ],
            [
              35.285854,
              -0.489223
            ],
            [
              35.292549,
              -0.490603
            ],
            [
              35.310059,
              -0.50124
            ],
            [
              35.311604,
              -0.509999
            ],
            [
              35.315552,
              -0.512402
            ],
            [
              35.311604,
              -0.518238
            ],
            [
              35.3092,
              -0.520813
            ],
            [
              35.306969,
              -0.529396
            ],
            [
              35.305767,
              -0.53815
            ],
            [
              35.326366,
              -0.570073
            ],
            [
              35.337353,
              -0.579174
            ],
            [
              35.350399,
              -0.551196
            ],
            [
              35.360184,
              -0.529912
            ],
            [
              35.367393,
              -0.521844
            ],
            [
              35.379925,
              -0.519798
            ],
            [
              35.381813,
              -0.525791
            ],
            [
              35.37838,
              -0.528537
            ],
            [
              35.375805,
              -0.530598
            ],
            [
              35.379581,
              -0.533002
            ],
            [
              35.383358,
              -0.54124
            ],
            [
              35.386276,
              -0.551025
            ],
            [
              35.390396,
              -0.558062
            ],
            [
              35.392456,
              -0.565959
            ],
            [
              35.391941,
              -0.585698
            ],
            [
              35.400867,
              -0.59514
            ],
            [
              35.408421,
              -0.607156
            ],
            [
              35.391769,
              -0.627581
            ],
            [
              35.396233,
              -0.636679
            ],
            [
              35.398464,
              -0.648179
            ],
            [
              35.426788,
              -0.720961
            ],
            [
              35.47863,
              -0.762152
            ],
            [
              35.506096,
              -0.774169
            ],
            [
              35.519142,
              -0.774856
            ],
            [
              35.538025,
              -0.779429
            ],
            [
              35.550041,
              -0.787557
            ],
            [
              35.570297,
              -0.767993
            ],
            [
              35.617676,
              -0.722684
            ],
            [
              35.639305,
              -0.741559
            ],
            [
              35.69149,
              -0.728517
            ],
            [
              35.69767,
              -0.758035
            ],
            [
              35.724792,
              -0.75735
            ],
            [
              35.733032,
              -0.786871
            ],
            [
              35.750885,
              -0.813649
            ],
            [
              35.752945,
              -0.831498
            ],
            [
              35.741272,
              -0.841797
            ],
            [
              35.730286,
              -0.865823
            ],
            [
              35.730972,
              -0.899462
            ],
            [
              35.702133,
              -0.926931
            ],
            [
              35.673981,
              -0.942732
            ],
            [
              35.612869,
              -0.98185
            ],
            [
              35.548325,
              -0.980478
            ],
            [
              35.46524,
              -0.933798
            ],
            [
              35.378723,
              -0.992835
            ],
            [
              35.332031,
              -1.002447
            ],
            [
              35.271606,
              -1.018211
            ],
            [
              35.241851,
              -1.036551
            ],
            [
              35.216675,
              -1.018211
            ],
            [
              35.189552,
              -1.029219
            ],
            [
              35.164833,
              -1.030595
            ],
            [
              35.131187,
              -1.028869
            ],
            [
              35.115051,
              -1.069716
            ],
            [
              35.089302,
              -1.058057
            ],
            [
              35.076942,
              -1.021676
            ],
            [
              35.062866,
              -0.998677
            ],
            [
              35.059776,
              -0.981858
            ],
            [
              35.037804,
              -0.983569
            ],
            [
              35.014458,
              -0.954385
            ],
            [
              34.990768,
              -0.964347
            ],
            [
              34.884682,
              -1.01376
            ],
            [
              34.851723,
              -0.987002
            ],
            [
              34.830437,
              -0.968809
            ],
            [
              34.833183,
              -0.950617
            ],
            [
              34.842796,
              -0.934482
            ],
            [
              35.006905,
              -0.891576
            ],
            [
              35.015792,
              -0.892985
            ],
            [
              35.007935,
              -0.883726
            ],
            [
              35.073853,
              -0.823344
            ],
            [
              35.087585,
              -0.776684
            ],
            [
              35.06012,
              -0.719045
            ],
            [
              35.054626,
              -0.650425
            ],
            [
              35.057373,
              -0.58455
            ],
            [
              35.05188,
              -0.488481
            ],
            [
              35.032654,
              -0.430838
            ],
            [
              34.996948,
              -0.406134
            ],
            [
              35.010681,
              -0.345746
            ],
            [
              35.038147,
              -0.307318
            ],
            [
              35.06012,
              -0.233204
            ],
            [
              35.101318,
              -0.18654
            ],
            [
              35.134277,
              -0.159091
            ],
            [
              35.200195,
              -0.164581
            ],
            [
              35.244141,
              -0.200265
            ],
            [
              35.271606,
              -0.233204
            ],
            [
              35.304565,
              -0.227715
            ],
            [
              35.343018,
              -0.23046
            ],
            [
              35.323792,
              -0.178306
            ],
            [
              35.285339,
              -0.170071
            ],
            [
              35.26886,
              -0.131641
            ],
            [
              35.233154,
              -0.095957
            ],
            [
              35.301819,
              -0.076742
            ],
            [
              35.362244,
              -0.112427
            ],
            [
              35.408936,
              -0.082232
            ],
            [
              35.411682,
              -0.032823
            ],
            [
              35.436401,
              0.013841
            ],
            [
              35.472107,
              0.008352
            ],
            [
              35.510559,
              0.008528
            ],
            [
              35.579224,
              -0.002372
            ],
            [
              35.631409,
              -0.035312
            ],
            [
              35.641708,
              -0.059739
            ],
            [
              35.669518,
              -0.048413
            ],
            [
              35.654411,
              -0.07553
            ],
            [
              35.690117,
              -0.073816
            ],
            [
              35.69046,
              -0.097503
            ],
            [
              35.69355,
              -0.108145
            ],
            [
              35.730972,
              -0.152436
            ],
            [
              35.722046,
              -0.181274
            ],
            [
              35.724106,
              -0.201873
            ],
            [
              35.768051,
              -0.200529
            ],
            [
              35.789337,
              -0.169614
            ],
            [
              35.79277,
              -0.160683
            ],
            [
              35.787277,
              -0.121532
            ],
            [
              35.793457,
              -0.112613
            ],
            [
              35.805817,
              -0.096127
            ],
            [
              35.821609,
              -0.121551
            ],
            [
              35.844269,
              -0.089198
            ],
            [
              35.879974,
              -0.032251
            ],
            [
              35.893707,
              -0.052879
            ],
            [
              35.90126,
              -0.054935
            ],
            [
              35.917053,
              -0.085163
            ],
            [
              35.925293,
              -0.075536
            ],
            [
              35.949326,
              -0.051461
            ],
            [
              35.982285,
              0.014479
            ],
            [
              36.040649,
              0.017862
            ],
            [
              36.095581,
              -0.013054
            ],
            [
              36.117554,
              0.004103
            ],
            [
              36.103821,
              0.057685
            ],
            [
              36.117554,
              0.056297
            ],
            [
              36.129227,
              0.056984
            ],
            [
              36.133347,
              0.111945
            ],
            [
              36.141586,
              0.122922
            ],
            [
              36.147079,
              0.182689
            ],
            [
              36.203384,
              0.2012
            ],
            [
              36.198578,
              0.216311
            ],
            [
              36.180038,
              0.226612
            ],
            [
              36.206818,
              0.236227
            ],
            [
              36.220551,
              0.216288
            ],
            [
              36.236343,
              0.208057
            ],
            [
              36.269989,
              0.164237
            ],
            [
              36.356506,
              0.157934
            ],
            [
              36.401825,
              0.129786
            ],
            [
              36.364746,
              0.052169
            ],
            [
              36.300888,
              0.054915
            ],
            [
              36.256256,
              0.032273
            ],
            [
              36.22879,
              0.008216
            ],
            [
              36.170425,
              -0.057714
            ],
            [
              36.129227,
              -0.14561
            ],
            [
              36.073608,
              -0.122934
            ],
            [
              36.059189,
              -0.138019
            ],
            [
              36.002197,
              -0.138734
            ],
            [
              35.956192,
              -0.1449
            ],
            [
              35.936279,
              -0.124968
            ],
            [
              35.890274,
              -0.157929
            ],
            [
              35.860748,
              -0.21289
            ],
            [
              35.831223,
              -0.211515
            ],
            [
              35.811996,
              -0.215637
            ],
            [
              35.79071,
              -0.217008
            ],
            [
              35.764618,
              -0.225942
            ],
            [
              35.746078,
              -0.218383
            ],
            [
              35.717239,
              -0.223164
            ],
            [
              35.69252,
              -0.210122
            ],
            [
              35.675354,
              -0.207377
            ],
            [
              35.671234,
              -0.16343
            ],
            [
              35.658102,
              -0.217408
            ],
            [
              35.657501,
              -0.229681
            ],
            [
              35.665226,
              -0.228737
            ],
            [
              35.680761,
              -0.232342
            ],
            [
              35.690975,
              -0.235347
            ],
            [
              35.703678,
              -0.237064
            ],
            [
              35.717239,
              -0.246075
            ],
            [
              35.713806,
              -0.244275
            ],
            [
              35.71166,
              -0.246162
            ],
            [
              35.71106,
              -0.2429
            ],
            [
              35.709085,
              -0.242043
            ],
            [
              35.697069,
              -0.248565
            ],
            [
              35.699301,
              -0.254229
            ],
            [
              35.70179,
              -0.252942
            ],
            [
              35.701962,
              -0.258092
            ],
            [
              35.709257,
              -0.26693
            ],
            [
              35.663509,
              -0.313959
            ],
            [
              35.636902,
              -0.31791
            ],
            [
              35.631409,
              -0.331988
            ],
            [
              35.609093,
              -0.344684
            ],
            [
              35.592785,
              -0.371987
            ]
          ]
        ]
      }
    },
    {
      "type": "Feature",
      "properties": {},
      "geometry": {
        "type": "Polygon",
        "coordinates": [
          [
            [
              34.850006,
              -1.283921
            ],
            [
              34.869232,
              -1.299023
            ],
            [
              34.896698,
              -1.336091
            ],
            [
              34.848633,
              -1.367667
            ],
            [
              34.779968,
              -1.41846
            ],
            [
              34.723663,
              -1.385514
            ],
            [
              34.723663,
              -1.363186
            ],
            [
              34.72229,
              -1.353921
            ],
            [
              34.720917,
              -1.345341
            ],
            [
              34.716797,
              -1.333674
            ],
            [
              34.713707,
              -1.321319
            ],
            [
              34.712334,
              -1.310681
            ],
            [
              34.709587,
              -1.302788
            ],
            [
              34.695511,
              -1.244112
            ],
            [
              34.755249,
              -1.271566
            ],
            [
              34.790268,
              -1.268132
            ],
            [
              34.823227,
              -1.273625
            ],
            [
              34.850006,
              -1.283921
            ]
          ]
        ]
      }
    }
  ]
}

The IBEAC company and the British colonial government referred to the Kipsigis people as 'Lumbwa' and 'Kwavi'. The pre-colonial traditional occupations of the Kipsigis included semi-pastoral herding, military expeditions, and farming sorghum and millet. Post-colonial Kipsigis today still live predominantly in their historical tribal territory on the Western Highlands of Kenya at an altitude of 1500m to 2000m; they mainly grow tea, undertake dairy farming and farm maize. They also grow wheat, pyrethrum and coffee.  The Kipsigis are also famous for their great singing talent. In tandem with the sterling success of Kenyan long-distance runners, the percipience that a majority of them are of Kalenjin origin also spills over to the bestowal of the same realization as there are many successful athletes and sportspersons from the tribe.

Origin, Establishment and Precolonial History

Origin

The Maliri people originally from Omo Valley in Ethiopia, immigrated into South Sudan and later Uganda; The Maliri are thought to have settled in what are now Jie country and large parts of Dodoth country in Uganda. Their arrival in the districts is estimated at 600 to 800 years ago (i.e. c.1200 to 1400 AD);  As a consequence of Lwoo incursion into the Maliri territory, the tribe broke into groups that would go on to forge the Pokot and Sebei factions of Kalenjin and Merille/Dasaanach (who migrated back to Omo Valley through the East banks of Lake Turkana). The Pokot faction would go on to interact with Maasai and Iraqw around Kerio Valley in Kenya with profound impact which would cement the emergence of Kalenjin tribes such as Cherang'any people; while Sebei interacted with Oropom thus possibly creating a seedbed in Mount Elgon highlands for a proto Nandi-Kipsigis group.

The Nandi account is that the ancestors of Nandi migrated from Mount Elgon under the leadership of Kakipoch. It is observed from the Nandi oral traditions that Lumbwa clans joined them later, thus implying that the Nandi adopted groups of people associated with Sirikwa culture. From local folk lore, the Kipsigis were initially a single group and identity with the Nandi as 'Chemwal' until 1800 when the community was separated by a wedge of Uas Nkishu Maasai in Kipchorian River (River Nyando); the resulting community south of Nandi hills (Kipkelion) became Kipsgis.

The recollection of various accounts among the Kipsigis describe an origin in Egypt and a migration route up the Nile for cooler climate with the group calling themselves 'Miotik' or 'Lote Bunik' with the later meaning cormorants; Along their migration route, they had transitionary settlements in countries they named: Burgei, Tto, Koita Tui/Lotik and finally Mount Elgon region. Later on, the accounts detail an interest among Miotik (Nandi and Kipsigis) to move into Lake Baringo where they possibly encountered the Maasai and pressed on South to Mau Summit and thus split into two; Kipsigis eponym being coined by their material culture of woven plates (Kisgisiik) which seems to have been a defining feature when they settled at Kipsigis Hill in Londiani.

Culture 
The Kipsigis observe a belief system maintained by all other Kalenjin people. The system observes polytheistic theism with the deities Asiis (a solar deity) and Tororot are each considered major deities. Some studies suggest that Tororot was the initial kalenjin deity but interactions in Kerio valley led to assimilation of the priestly Kibasisek clan whose peculiarity is having the Sun as their tortem; they were much sought after to perform marriage rituals and other religious activities. While multiple other deities exist independently to one another.  In the Kipsigis' monotheistic belief system, Asis is instead considered the single supreme deity and the other deities are considered Asis' attributes, rather than independent entities. The Kipsigis allude to cultural values including superstition, spiritualism, and a sacred & cyclical nature of life. They believe all elements of the natural world are connected, that good deeds never go unnoticed, and that bad deeds lead to consequences in various forms. The Kipsigis view "happiness" as a lack of negative experiences, indicating a quiet and calm state. This convention under the culture and positive psychology studies when contrasted to other indigenous communities gives researchers an obstacle in obtaining a qualitative or quantitative measure of happiness.

The Kipsigis people's oral tradition is observed to have a rich background in songs. Many of their oral traditions feature a creature known as Chemosi', which is interchangeable with the Nandi bear; a monstrous ape-like basic-intelligence creature which also feature among other communities of Kenya, Uganda and parts of Congo.

A western adventurer Edgar Beecher Bronson claims to have seen a creature that he notes the Lumbwa people referred to as Dingonek. He describes a fearsome-looking water creature whose features include an armadillo-like, leopard-patterned, hippo-sized back and a leopard's head with two large protruding fangs. He reports that the Lumbwa and the Wadoko peoples spoke of such a creature in the Maggori River then provides an account of his sighting of the said creature. His is the only account of such a creature.

 Astronomy and calendar 

The Milky Way is known as Poit'ap kechei (literally sea of stars), the morning star – Tapoiyot, the midnight star – Kokeliet, and Orion's Belt – Kakipsomok. The Milky Way was traditionally perceived as a great lake in which children are bathing and playing. Furthermore, the movement of stars was sometimes linked to earthly concerns. For example, the appearance or non-appearance of the Pleiades indicated whether or not to expect a good or a bad harvest. Sometimes superstitions were held regarding certain events. A halo was traditionally said to represent a cattle stockade. At least as of the early 20th century, a break occurring on the east side was considered to be unlucky while one on the west side was seen to be lucky. A comet was at the same time regarded as the precursor of a great misfortune.

The Kipsigis call a month 'Arawet', which is also the term for our satellite, the moon. A year is called 'Kenyit' which can be derived from the phrase 'Ki-nyit' meaning 'to accomplish, to fill in'. A year was marked by the order of months and more importantly by ceremonial and religious celebration of the yearly harvest which was held at the various shrines. This event being analogous to a practice observed by most of the other Africans has inspired the Kwanza festivities celebrated by predominantly by people of African descent in the United States. Kenyit started in February. It had two seasons known as olto (pl. oltosiek) and was divided into twelve months, arawet (pl. arawek). In place of a decade is the order of Ibinda which is usually between 10 and 17 years. In place of a century is the completion of the age set which takes between 100 and 120 years.

The first season of the year, olt-ap-iwot (iwotet), was the wet season and ran from March to August. The dry season, olt-ap-keme (kemeut), ran from September to February. The kipsunde and kipsunde oieng harvest ceremonies were held in September and October respectively to mark the change in Seasons.

 Months (arawek) and Seasons 

 Geo-Political and Military organisation 

 Social Organization 
The Kipsigis tribe is a patriarchal society that was organized in terms of geo-political groupings, clan systems, age sets and military ranks.

 Genealogical organisation (Ortiinweek) 
The Kipsigis organize themselves into a series of groupings based on shared kinship analogous to clans. A clan is brought about by a shared ancestor with a context of adoption as a way of naturalization into the clan, usually from Maasai/Gusii/Luo as Kipsigis cannot adopt from within Kalenjin. The patriarchal ancestors, notably the patriarch Kakipoch, immigrated the Nandi-Kipsigis population to Uasin Ngishu plains and Kerio Valley. Formulation of the clan system is thought to have come about due to assimilation of other communities and population growth as a system of preventing pedigree collapse and in-breeding as the main purpose of clans was to prevent marriage within the same clan (marriages being mainly heterosexual but with a lesbian marriage in context). Clans also projected various professionalism and probably adopted identities where for instance, certain clans were exclusively priests, others were exclusively smiths, others exclusively hunters and gathers while others had other particular peculiarities.

 Generations 
The Kipsigis observe a cyclical generation setting system. The system seems to have been arrogated plausibly from the Bantu Kikuyu people. The system completes a full rotation in between about a hundred and a hundred and twenty years. The set is composed of generations that extend between 15 and 20 years. The system was used to account for historical events and demographic management.

 Geo-Political organization 
Em or emet, was the highest recognized geographic division among the Kipsigis. It spans a geopolitical region demarcated as being a jurisdiction of the tribe and entitled to a decree of sovereignty. This unit was identifiable as a political institution but the main work of civil control and administration was done by the kokwotinwek (plural of kokwet). Linguistic evidence indicates that this form of societal organization dates back to their Southern Nilotic heritage. It is believed that the Southern Nilotes of two thousand years ago cooperated in loose supra-clan groupings, called *e:m.Kokwet was the most significant political and judicial unit among the Kipsigis. The governing body of each kokwet was its kok (village council). Kokwet denotes a geographic cluster of settlement similar in concept to a village. Kok elders were the local authority for arbitration and conflict resolution.

 The Office of the King (Oorgoiiyoot) 
Operational in Nandi, the Orkoiyot institution was communed to Kipsigis not later than 1850, after the ousting and assassination of Kimnyole Arap Turgat. Kimnyole sent his three sons (Kipchomber arap Koilege, Arap Boisyo and Arap Buigut) to Kipsigis who immediately began to establish a Kipsigis confederation, each of them establishing kingly homesteads with servants, messengers and reception parlors. The office of the Oorgoiiyoot was dissolved after the Lumbwa Treaty.

 Military organisation 

While evidence suggests precolonial Kipsigis as having engaged in conquests of territory, a mistaken impression emerges of an efficient organized military; rather the existence of a Kipsigis army was indicative of a social organization at the tribal level despite evidence of large portions of conquered territory and defeat of strong armies. The precolonial Kipsigis were presented as a markedly acephalous society politically with both military and political organization having to be examined in terms of relatively autonomous territorial groups within the tribe.

The Kipsigis armies organized themselves into 4 (four) regiments (pororiosiek) namely: Kikaige, Ng'etunyo, Kebeni and Kasanet. Recruitment into the regiments was achieved through the age set and clan system. Each regiment fought independently which often resulted in weak and often conflicting strategies. At a later stage, the four regiments merged into two consisting of Kipkaige and Kasanet on the one side and Ng'etunyo and Kebeni on the other; but ultimately, the strength of this army was tested with a resounding defeat at the hands of Gusii in the battle of Ngoina dated to circa 1850. Once again, the Kipsigis army regiments regrouped into one force composed equally of all four regiments and while this development would spur a record of victories, it would also be tested in the battle of Mogori circa 1890 with a defeat that had dire implications on the spirit and identity of the Kipsigis.

Other studies depict a more elaborate military organization; for instance, there were an extra tire of regiments and ranks including: the generals (Kiptayat/Kiptaiinik), spies (Yotiik, Seegeik and Sogooldaiik), and the procession ranks (Ng'anymetyeet, Pirtiich, Oldimdo/Lumweet and Kipeelbany). There were yearly mock up practice for warring called Kaambageet.

The arms of the fighting men usually consisted of a spear, shield, sword and club. By the late 19th century, up to four kinds of spears, representing various eras and areas were in use. In Nandi, the eren-gatiat, of the Sirkwa era was still in use though only by old men. It had a short and small leaf-shaped blade with a long socketed shank and a long butt. Two types of the Maasai era spear, known as ngotit, were also in use. Those of the eastern, northern and southern counties had long narrow blades with long iron butt, short socket and short shaft. Those of the central county (emgwen) had short broad blades with short iron butts. In the western counties, a spear that had a particularly small head, a long shaft and no butt was in use, it was known as ndirit. The pastoral Pokot carried two Maasai era spears, known as ngotwa while the agricultural sections armed themselves with a sword, known as chok.

Archery was also very much a prominent skill practiced among the Kipsigis for purposes ranging from agriculture to defense and security. There were an array of arrows for various specialties such as for shooting a bull for blood, hunting arrows and defensive arrows meant either as a deterrent by causing mortal wounds or others meant to get stuck in the victim while others were poisoned and thus each of the arrow types were used depending on the occasion.

 Significant wars and battles 

 Historical Kipsigis War Heros 
The military culture of the Kipsigis directly led to adoration of war heros and successful commanders. Some of them include: Araap Ngulolu, Kipsiongo Araap Terer of Kipkoibon, Araap Taptugen of Belgut, Araap Buiywo,  Araap Nyarino, Araap Tamasoon, Araap Kirui of Kapkugoeek clan, Araap Tompo, Araap Mastamet, Araap Cheriro, Kendeiywo Araap Baliach, Arap Moigi and Araap Tengecha (who stood out among all of them and a close friend of Jomo Kenyatta).

 Precolonial History 
Breaking away from the former Chemwal ethnicity and becoming Kipsigis in about 1790s and 1800s, the Kipsigis population grew from an estimated population of less than five hundred in what is today's, Fort Tenan. From here, they acquired military resilience against the neighbouring Luo who would go on to call them Jalang'o because of this new commorant attribute. They also fought Kisii communities out of today's Kabianga in Kericho West District and Easterwards against the Maasai who occupied parts of Kipkelion, Kericho and Londiani. The expansion of the Kipsigis territory was rapid and violent and by the 1890s as Orkoiyot institution was established, Kipsigis territory extended from Nandi Hills in the North to Sotik in the South, with a thin waisted region in Bureti.

 Menya Arap Kisiara 
Menya isnarrated among the Kipsigis as an excellent diplomat and war hero. He is credited for defeating Maasai who used to inhabit larger portions of Kericho county.  Significant battles are recalled having been fought in Iltianit(Londiani), fought in Kericho, Chemoiben, and then Siriat in Sotik. Initially an outcast and an outlier, Menyua Arap Kisiara was banished off the tribal land for marrying a Kapkerichek clanswoman which at the time, was also his own clan. He defected with his company of confidant warriors, - Tapkile and Kipketes/Kipkeles into Maasai community. He then started his own clan of Kapkaon. Returning later on as formidable warrior and establishing his army, he challenged the Maasai into a duel estimated from oral traditions to have taken place in the 1770s to where Kaplong town in Sotik is situated today, Menya led an army to war against the Maasai in order to resolve land disputes and territorial privileges. The war ensued for a number of weeks to a couple of months and for the most part, both sides lost many warriors, and many were injured. Towards the end, Menya called in a truce and overnight, amassed aid and reinforcements from Kipsigis warriors across the whole of Kipsigis. On returning to the ultimate and decisive battle, he easily outwitted the Maasai with an army of an estimated 3000 warriors or more. Maasai conceded defeat and resolved to vacate what constitutes today most if not all of Bomet County and Narok West Constituency.

 Orgoik 
'Orgoik' (plural) or 'sigular', Orgoiyoot is any clansperson of the Talaai clan spread across Nandi, Kipsigis, Tugen and Marakwet. In Kipsigis, most of the Talaai clansmen can identify a patrilineal genealogy to three sons of Kimnyole Araap Turgat namely: Kipchomber Araap Koilege, Chebochok Kiptonui Araap Boisyo and Araap Buiygut; Koitalel Araap Samoei was their younger sibling. The three brothers were sent by their father, Araap Turgat to Kipsigis nation shortly before his assassination by the Nandi people. Their benefactor was their uncle, Araap Kiroisi of Sotik.

Considered special and thought to have out-of-worldly powers, the three were pushed into leadership and for the first time in Kipsigis history, they were able to hold positions that can be equalled to a king or leaders of autonomous regions. Their influence led to expansion of the Kipsigis territory adding to the achievements of Menya Araap Kisiara. They were also considered herbal medicinemen and thus acquired wealth from war reparation and pay for medical services. They went on to have very sedentary lifestyles with their homesteads employing several servants and a primitive equivalent of slaves.

Following Lumbwa treaty between Kipsigis and The British, the three brothers got arrested and would later on about 1903 be deported to Kikuyu-land while their siblings and immediate families consisting of about 700 individuals were banished to Gwassi in Homa Bay County and stayed there excommunicated between 1934 and 1962. They were later on resettled in Kablilo, Sigowet-Soin, Kiptere, Ainamoi, Belgut and some few in Emgwen.

Among the Kipsigis, there is speculative talk that implicates Daniel Arap Moi and Jomo Kenyatta as having relations with the Orgoik.

 Kipchomber arap Koilege 

He lived in Cheriri in Kiptere before he was imprisoned by the British and sent to Rusinga island of Kisumu. He was instrumental in dispersing Luo people from Kiptere to Sondu. Among the Kipsigis, and perhaps among all the other Kalenjin, Arap Koilege is believed to have blessed Kenyatta Jomo and handed to him his attire which included a hide, a belt colloquially called 'Kenyatet', a head gear among others after which, Koilege asked Kenyatta to visit a leader of the Maasai who was a Laibon. The attire was worn by Jomo very many ceremonial times when he was the president of Kenya. Today, Jomo Kenyatta's traditional attire is buried with him in a muselium in Kenya's National Assembly building in Nairobi.

 Chebochok Kiptonui arap Boisio 
Chebochock was the son to Kimyole Arap Turgat. After Kimnyole was ousted and assassinated by the Nandi, Chebochok and his two brothers found refuge among the Kipsigis people while Koitalel Arap Samoei found refuge among the Tugen people. Chebochock Kiptonui arap Boisio settled in Londiani. He established himself a kingly estate. He empowered and commandeered Kipsigis armies to acquire land towards Laikipia.

He is reported or speculated to have fathered a boy to a widow who used to herd cattle, she was known as Wambui. The boy is reported to have been named Johnstone Peter Kamau. She then moved to a farm in Nyeri where she married Muigai but who later divorced her because of issues associated with cuckoldry.

In 1913, Chebochok Kiptonui Arap Boiso and his two brothers were banished to Fort Hall and Nyeri. Coincidentally, Wambui was assigned the role to look after the three brothers by the Europeans.

 Kibuigut 

 Mugenik Barngetuny Araap Sitonik 
Barngetuny Mugenik was a Kipsigis prophet who is still respected by the Kipsigis community. His age set was initiated between 1815 and 1838, and lived in what is now the town of Sotik, located in Bomet county. He was of the Kipkendek clan, and his maternal uncle was Kimyole Araap Turukat, from Talai clan, the famous Nandi Orgoiyot. It is estimated that he died in 1885 and was buried adjacent to what is today's Sotik Police station in Sotik town. The Kipsigis hold that Mugenik had revelations and visions which he told to the people. These revelations contained instruction on how the Kipsigis people were expected to live a holy life before Asiis, their solar deity. Mugenik's visions also foretold future events that were to take place in the Kipsigis country. Among his prophecies were the arrival of the British, the arrival of trains, the development of towns, modern clothing, and the establishment of colonialism and the eventual independence of African nations. Also significantly, it is narrated how he had visions of the establishment of Sotik Police station, Sotik KCC creameries factory and two of Sotik bridges that were to be operated under colour bar system. There are also accounts from his visions that detail vast expansion of the Kipsigis territory and others that hint a macabrely decimation of the Kipsigis population as a handiwork of a boy, or more precisely translated to mean derogatively an uncircumcised boy. Among many other prophecies, perhaps of great intrigue to the Kipsigis was one in which he foretold about a Kipsigis man with a star on his (possibly military) who lead what is equivalent to Kenyan jurisdiction today.

 Colonial History 
The Kipsigis had an initial contact with the British in 1889 and within 17 years, the British had established their rule over the tribe.  The British initially started to expropriate the tribal Kipsigis land to create a buffer zone between the mutually antagonistic Gusii and Kipsigis; but it was clear from the beginning that an underlying tenet of the British policy towards the Kipsigis was the ultimate conversion of the tribe from a predominantly semi-pastoral economy to one of peasant cultivation.

 Lumbwa Treaty 

 Sotik Massacre 

Originally not part of the White Highlands, Sotik District was a Y-shaped strip of land about 50 miles and in some places not more than three miles wide, carved out of the Native Reserve. Sotik was Abugusii and Maasai territory before 1800 but, under a treaty promulgated by Menya Araap Kisiara, the Maasai were pushed to Trans-Mara. Following the arrival of the British, the Kipsigis rallied alongside the Nandis to fight against the building of the Kenya-Uganda Railway.

Seeing the long-drawn-out resistance of the Nandi led by Koitalel Araap Samoei, the intelligence officer Richard Meinertzhagen, vowed to break the impasse. In the middle of 1905, a punitive raid led by Major Pope Hennessy killed 1,850 men, women, and children who were rounded up and fired upon indiscriminately with a Maxim gun and other weapons. The massacre was ostensibly in retaliation against the refusal by the Sotik people to heed an ultimatum by the British government to return cattle raided from the Maasai. It is noted that medal of honours were awarded to officers who took part in these operations around the same time.

Some months later on 19 October 1905, Richard Meinertzhagen tricked Koitalel into what was effectively an ambush and shot him at point-blank range, killing him on the spot and the rest of his entourage. With Koitalel dead, the Nandi resistance was neutralized, and the British proceeded to evict the Kipsigis and Nandi from their land and sent them to areas that were largely unfit for human habitation. The Sotik massacre and the assassination of Koitalel were directly linked to the setting aside of Sotik for European settlement and the colonial system of forced labour, punitive taxes for Africans, economic, and racial segregation. It is disingenuous to argue that it was a buffer zone to keep warring African tribes apart.

In August 2020, following the murder of Gerge Floyd, Claudia Webbe, Member of Parliament for Leicester East wrote in a letter addressed to UK's Secretary of State for Education, Gavin Williamson about Sotik Massacre and asked that the massacre should be taught in British schools.

 World War I 
World War I is infered among the Kipsigis as 'Boriet ap Talianek - literally 'Italian War' and it's an inflection point among the Kipsigis coming out of which, integration into mordernity. Some men were drafted or volunteered to fight and it is remarked how the Empire they fought for did not recognize them or keep any records or accounts of African soldiers.

Nandi Protest of 1923 
A number of factors taking place in the early 1920s led to what has come to be termed the Nandi Protest or Uprisings of 1923. It was the first expression of organized resistance by the Nandi since the wars of 1905–06.

Primary contributing factors were the land alienation of 1920 and a steep increase in taxation, taxation tripled between 1909 and 1920 and because of a change in collection date, two taxes were collected in 1921. The Kipsigis and Nandi refused to pay and this amount was deferred to 1922. Further, due to fears of a spread of rinderpest following an outbreak, a stock quarantine was imposed on the Nandi Reserve between 1921 and 1923. The Nandi, prevented from selling stock outside the Reserve, had no cash, and taxes had to go unpaid. Normally, grain shortages in Nandi were met by selling stock and buying grain. The quarantine made this impossible. The labour conscription that took place under the Northey Circulars only added to the bitterness against the colonial government.

All these things contributed to a buildup of antagonism and unrest toward the government between 1920 and 1923. In 1923, the saget ab eito (sacrifice of the ox), a historically significant ceremony where leadership of the community was transferred between generations, was to take place. This ceremony had always been followed by an increased rate of cattle raiding as the now formally recognized warrior age-set sought to prove its prowess. The approach to a saget ab eito thus witnessed expressions of military fervor and for the ceremony all Nandi males would gather in one place.

Alarmed at the prospect and as there was also organized protest among the Kikuyu and Luo at that time, the colonial government came to believe that the Orkoiyot was planning to use the occasion of the Saget ab eito of 1923 as a cover under which to gather forces for a massive military uprising. On 16 October 1923, several days before the scheduled date for the saget ab eito, the Orkoiyot Barsirian Arap Manyei and four other elders were arrested and deported to Meru. Permission to hold the ceremony was withdrawn and it did not take place, nor has it ever taken place since. The Orkoiyot Barsirian Arap Manyei would spend the next forty years in political detention, becoming Kenya's, and possibly Africa's, longest-serving political prisoner.

MBE. Senior Chief Cheborge arap Tengecha 
Cheborge Arap Tengecha was a distinguished and decorated war hero among the Kipsigis. He was appointed the Senior Chief of the Kipsigis Tribe in Kenya by the British Colonial government. He was a close friend of Jomo Kenyatta. He was accorded the Queen's birthday honours of 1961 as a Member of the Order of the British Empire (MBE), Civil Division.

World War II 
With the German, Italian and Japanese threat at the borders of the British Empire, many people were dragged into military service during World War II. In East Africa, a huge number of Kenyans were recruited to serve in the Burma and Ethiopian Campaigns. Known to the Kipsigis as 'Boriet ap Jeromaan''', literally German war, the world event marks a period of time and denotes a generation where some of its youthful men either volunteered or were drafted into the King's African Riffles forces. In the 1940s, KAR soldiers were dispatched to fight German forces between what is Kenya-Tanzania border today, moreso in Taita-Tavetta. Apparently, Some were dipatched to join the fight in Burma and Japan. After the war, African soldiers were forgotten and hardly any records of them and their accounts were kept.

Post-independence
 Emerging socio-cultural trends and dynamics 
The Kipsigis culture and heritage has transformed and attritioned initially as a result of the contact with British colonialists and a remarkable switch to Christianity, forsaking the belief in Asiis or incorporating some aspects of their traditional religion into Christianity. Later on, a formal colonial government meant the tribe had to comply with government rules and laws which in part vitiated some traditional norms such as warring and raiding neighboring antagonistic tribes. After independence, the declining of adherence to culture and heritage subsisted, significantly, the banning of female genital mutilation led to abandonment of initiation of girls while schooling limited the period of time boys spent in seclusion during initiation; apparently, because of the spread of HIV and the devastating impact associated as some of the first cases were reported in Kenya in the late 1980s, circumcision of boys was promoted and as a result, the custom of initiation of boys persisted.

 Music, Film and written Arts 
Contemporary Kalenjin music has long been influenced by Kipsigis producers, artistes and musicians leading to Kericho's perception as a cultural innovation center in Kenya and effectively in the Great-Lakes Region of Africa. Community introspection reveals how Chepalungu constituency has beaten the odds to carve a niche for itself as the home of Kalenjin secular artistes. One notable Raphael Kipchamba arap Tapotuk was a luminary artiste, song writer and producer credited as being a forebearer of Kalenjin pop culture often manifesting his works as folk song, country and jazz. His music records are beloved by the entirety of Kalenjin; Daniel Toroitich Arap Moi, William Samoei Ruto and a host of Kalenjin leaders and celebrities in attending Kipchamba's funeral in his home in Chepalungu, 14 April 2007 remarked the might and their love for the artiste.

A song "Chemirocha III" collected by ethnomusicologist Hugh Tracey in 1950 from the Kipsigis in Kapkatet in Kericho was written in honour of Jimmie Rodgers. The song's title is an approximation of the musician's name. According to legend, tribe members were exposed to Rodgers' music through British soldiers during World War II. Impressed by his yodeling, they envisioned Rodgers as "a faun, half-man and half-antelope." The most transfixing of the three sides, “Chemirocha III” is credited to “Chemutoi Ketienya with Kipsigis girls,” and was described by Tracey as “humorous” in his notes although some critics remark the record as being supernal and out of this world. The song is about dancing so hard your pants fall off—about a joy so full that it can't be mediated. “Chemirocha III” is included on Tracey's “The Music of Africa: Musical Instruments 1: Strings” LP, from 1972.

Kimursi, an actor in the 1950 adventure film: King Solomon's Mines, is credited as being of Kipsigis ethnicity. In the cast, he took on the role of Khiva.

The Kenyan long distance runner Ezekiel Kemboi danced to a Kalenjin hit single, 'Emily Chepchumba' during the 2011 IAAF Daegu World championship, after crossing the finish line in the 3000 metres steeplechase and during the London Summer Olympics held in August 2012, after crossing the finish line in the 3000 metre steeple chase finals and winning gold. The song was written, sang and recorded by a Kipsigis artist, Bamwai

Sports
Kalenjin are reputable as an ethnic conglomerate endemic with athletic prowess. The Kipsigis, the most populous tribe among the Kalenjin has had a culture of sportsmanship among its population and through the years, there have been excellent sportsmen and sportswomen from the tribe. It is believed that genetic predisposition, altitude and environmental adaptation, diet, poverty and all-inclusive training philosophy contribute to the success of Kalenjin sportspersons.

 Science and academia 
It is observed that among the Kipsigis, knowledge is measured binomially where to be thought of as knowledgeable, ng’om, one has to display the application of the corresponding knowledge. In academia, the 'Kipsigis' word or eponym has inspired the nomenclature of an extinct genus of East African antelope from the middle Miocene (Kipsigicerus). Other academic terms associated with the Kipsigis include: Acraea sotikensis and Sotik lion (Panthera leo melanochaita).

Dr. Taaitta Araap Toweett was a Kipsigis elite and political leader. He was awarded scholarship by the Kipsigis County Council in 1955 to the South Devon Technical College, Torquay, to study for a diploma in public and social administration. He obtained a B.A. (1956) and B.A. (Hons) 1959 from the University of South Africa. On his return from Britain in 1957, he was appointed Community Development Officer for Nandi District, the first African CDO to be recruited locally in Kenya. During this period was the editor of the Kipsigis vernacular magazine Ngalek Ap Kipsigisiek, published quarterly. He was one of the eight original Africans elected to the Legislative Council in 1958 as Member for the Southern Area, a constituency comprising mainly Kipsigis and Maasai Districts. He formed Kalenjin Political Alliance Party that later on got into an alliance with KADU. He served on the Dairy Board and played a crucial role in the foundation of the co-operative movement nationally. In 1960, 1962, 1963 he attended the Lancaster House Conferences held in London to draft Kenya's Constitution, paving the way for complete self-rule. Before Kenya's independence, he was appointed Assistant Minister for Agriculture (1960), Minister of Labour and Housing in 1961 and Minister of Lands, Surveys and Town Planning in 1962. After Kenya's Independence, he was appointed Minister for Education in 1969, Minister for Housing and Social Services in 1974, Minister for Education in 1976. He was also elected President of the 19th General Assembly of UNESCO (1976–78). In 1977, he finished his PhD thesis on "A Study of Kalenjin Linguistics". In 1980, he was appointed as the chairperson of Kenya Literature Bureau. In 1983–1985, he served as the Charperson, Kenya Airways after which he was appointed the chairperson, Kenya Seed Company. He also served as a Director of the Kenya Times newspaper and went on to edit and publish his own newspaper, Voice of Rift Valley between 1997 and 2000.

Professor Jonathan Kimetet Araap Ngeno was a Kipsigis elite who was sponsored by African Inland Church from Litein to study in the United States. He was invited back to Kenya and reintegrated by Daniel arap Moi to achieve political attrition over Dr. Taaitta Toweett. He was appointed to Ministerial positions and was elected the Fourth Speaker of the Parliament of Kenya succeeding coincidentally his baghuleita (a male agemate who was initiated in the same seclusion home), Moses Kiprono arap Keino.

In the 1990s, Professor Davy Kiprotich Koech by then the Director of Kenya Medical Research Institute and Dr. Arthur O. Obel, the Chief Research Officer published in two medical journals the initial results of the newfound drug   "Kemron" that was perceived from the preliminary study of 10 patients to cure AIDS. The drug was introduced in a public ceremony presided by Kenya's former President, Daniel Toroitch Arap Moi and the work of the new wonder drug discovered was hailed as a major step against HIV/AIDS.Kemron was the trade name for a low-dose of alpha interferon, manufactured form of a natural body chemical in a tablet form that dissolves in the mouth. Clinical trials of Kemron funded by WHO in five African Countries did not find any health benefits reported by Kemri Scientists. Thereafter, WHO in a press release in its headquarters in Geneva, Switzerland, termed Kemron as an experimental drug of unproven benefit for HIV/AIDS treatment. The American National Institute of Health concluded that no one had been able to duplicate the effects claimed by scientists behind Kemron drug. In 1998 Prof. Davy Koech led the Commission of Inquiry into the Education System of Kenya. Hosted by Kenya Broadcasting Cooperation (KBC) in 2019, Prof. Koech cited bad peer review on his experimental drug and that he was currently overseeing reexamination of the Kemron drug and further research in China.

Professor Richard Kiprono Mibey has discovered more than 120 species of fungi, made major input to the discovery of environmentally friendly fungi for bio-control of the obnoxious water hyacinth weed in Lake Victoria has contributed to the preservation of rare and highly specialised micro-fungi of Kenyan plants.

Professor Paul Kiprono Chepkwony, the incumbent governor of Kericho County has declared in a Kenyan comedy show, Churchill Show (hosted in Tea Hotel Kericho in 2018) a lengthy list pending and granted patents on various fields of Biochemistry.

Professor Moses King'eno Rugut is a Kenyan Research Scientist and the current C.E.O the National Commission for Science, Technology and Innovation. He sits in the board of National Quality Control Laboratory, Kenya Agricultural & Livestock Research Organization, committee member on Drug Registration at Pharmacy & Poisons Board since 1999 and National Museums of Kenya. He also served as the Director General of the defunct KARI that was de-gazetted and was preceded by a newly established state agency KALRO and as Deputy Secretary at the Ministry of Higher Education, Science and Technology before being appointed the chief executive officer, National Commission for Science, Technology and Innovation. He was awarded Head of State's Commendations in the year 2008 for his distinguished service to the nation and subsequently awarded with the Order of the Grand Warrior, OGW in the year 2016 Prof. Moses Rugut has authored, co-authored or authored publications alongside other authors. Some of these publications include: Seroepidemiological survey of Taenia saginata cysticercosis in Kenya; Diagnosis of Taenia saginata cysticercosis in Kenyan cattle by antibody and antigen ELISA; Anthelmintic resistance amongst sheep and goats in Kenya and Epidemiology and control of ruminant helminths in the Kericho Highlands of Kenya.Gladys Chepkirui Ngetich is a Kenyan engineer of Kipsigis origin, and a Rhodes scholar pursuing a doctorate degree in aerospace engineering at the University of Oxford, in the United Kingdom. She is the recipient of the Tanenbaum Fellowship and the Babaroa Excellence Award. In 2018, Ngetich was credited with a patent in collaboration with Rolls-Royce Plc. Her research work has been in BBC Science and the Oxford Science Blog and Medium. She received the ASME IGTI Young Engineer Turbo Expo Participation Award, for her paper at the 2018 Annual American Society of Mechanical Engineers (ASME) conference. In September 2018, Business Daily Africa named Ngitech among its "Top 40 Under 40 Women in Kenya in 2018". In 2019 she started investigating sustainable space science using a Schmidt Science Fellowship. Ngetich is the co-founder of the ILUU, a Nairobi-based non-profit that aims to inspire girls and women.

 Dr Richard Kiprotich Chepkwony is a Kenyan wildlife ecologist of Kipsigis origin and currently the Senior Assistant Director at the Kenya Wildlife Service and the State Department of Wildlife, Ministry of Tourism, Wildlife and Heritage. He hails from Cheborgei Bureti Sub-County, Kericho County. He studied at Chepsir Primary school in Kericho East. He was awarded a scholarship by the Interdisciplinary Research Fund INREF-CCGIAR-EVOCA programme in 2016 to the  Wageningen University and Research(WUR) in the Kingdom of the Netherlands, from where he obtained his doctorate degree in wildlife Ecology and Innovations in 2021. He is an alumnus of Kaplong Boys' High School in Bomet County and Moi University Eldoret, Kenya, where he obtained his bachelor's and Master of Science degrees in wildlife management and Ecology. He has also studied environmental sciences at Tokyo International centre, Japan; Information technology at the Kenya School of Government; Kenya Wildlife Service Law Enforcement Academy-Manyani, among others. He has published widely in the fields of ticks and tick-borne diseases, technology and innovation, Spatial biopolitics of infectious disease control, human-wildlife interactions and Plant Ecology. He is supervising PhD and master's students from Wageningen University and Research. He has a vast knowledge of human-wildlife coexistence, spanning more than 23 years.

Politics

 Community Politics 
The Kipsigis community is a rich political arena. The Kipsigis present themselves in a united political front along with their kin, the Kalenjin mass. With the leadership of Daniel Moi, Kalenjin community took a leftist form and were in favour of divolved governance under the alias, Majimboism. When Moi became the president of Kenya, Kalenjins shifted to a right wing front with solemn support for Moi and his government. During Moi's regime, incidences of politically motivated violence took place and Kipsigis for the most part were touted as perpetrators. Under Mwai Kibaki, Kipsigis and Kalenjin in entirety took a passive political approach which then bounced back to a roller coaster of leftist and right wing support in alliagence to the rising star of Kalenjin Politics, Dr. William Samoei Ruto.

 Prominent leadership 

 Presidency 

Whilst the Kipsigis tribe consider Jomo Kenyatta as the spurious love child of the Kipsigis Orkoiyot, Chebochok Kiptonui Arap Boiso, they aspire to present Kenya with a president. Apparently. William Samoei Kipchirchir Ruto, Kipsigis in origin and from Komosi clan has served in various ministerial positions, and as the Deputy President of Kenya under Uhuru Kenyatta's presidency. As of August 2022, William Ruto was announced the winner of the Kenyan 2022 general elections and after a court appeal by the defeated candidate, Raila Odinga, Ruto's win was upheld. William Samoei Ruto was inaugurated in September 2022 as the fifth president of the Republic of Kenya and is currently the incumbent president.

 Ambassadors 

 Francis Sigey (Kibororek): Ambassador of Kenya to Nigeria
 Joshua Terer (KipKesbaek): Ambassador of Kenya to India

 Speaker of Parliament 

 Moses Kiprono arap Keino (Kipkelezek clan): Third Speaker of the Parliament of Kenya from 1988 until 1991
 Professor Jonathan Kimetet arap Ng'eno (Becherek clan): Fourth Speaker of the Parliament of Kenya from 1991 until 1993
 Joyce Cherono Laboso: Deputy Speaker of the National Assembly of Kenya, between 2013 and 2017.

 Cabinet Ministers and Cabinet Secretaries 
There have been a number of cabinet ministers and cabinet secretaries from the Kipsigis ethnicity. A number of them include

 Dr. Taaitta Toweett (Zoigoeek Clan): Labour and Housing (1961), Lands, Survey & Town Planning (1962), Education (1974) and Housing and Social Services (1974)
 Prof. Jonathan Kimetet Araap Ngeno (Bechereek Clan): Education (1974), Housing and Social Services
 John Koech: East Africa Comminuty
 Frankline Bett (Moochoeek Clan): Roads and Transportation
 Davis Chirchir: Engineering and Petroleum (2013-207)
 Eng. John Mosonik(): Transport (2013-2017)
 Charles Keter(): Energy (2017-2022)

 MAU Settlement Programs and Evictions 

The Kipsigis initial settlement was at Tulwaap Kipsigis in Londiani; strategically, the hill makes up part of the Mau Forest reserve in Kenya. The Kipsigis believe they have a 'god-given' claim upon the forest which alludes to the adoption at some point in the Kipsigis history of the aboriginal hunter-gatherer tribe, the Okiek who are native to a region between Mount Kenya stretching up all the way to Mau Forest in Rift Valley. Mau crisis started when the trust land was allocated to group ranches between the 1980s and 1990s who were mainly ethnic Maasai elite during Daniel Moi's Kanu era. The problem exacerbated about when the group ranches went beyond the cutline and occupied forest land. Part of the Mau Forest was initially a trust land under the defunct Narok County Council. Traditionally, the forest has been inhabited by the Ogiek. However, due to immigration from other ethnic groups, large parts of the forest area were cleared for settlement. In 2004, the famous Ndungu Report listed these land allocations, terming them illegal and recommended their revocation of them. Some evictions were done between 2004 and 2006 without a resettlement option. In 2005, the government placed a caveat on all title deeds issued to claimants, saying they were irregularly issued.

In 2008, the Kibaki regime through the then Prime Minister Raila Odinga ordered evictions to be effected by October 2008 in order to protect the forest from destruction. The order was opposed by several Rift Valley politicians led by Isaac Ruto. The then Agriculture Minister William Ruto, proposed evictees be allocated land elsewhere. Later, Environment Minister John Michuki would reverse the order. Subsequently, in 2008, there was a political row over the resettlement of people in the Mau Forest who had been allocated land in the 1980s and 1990s.

 Redress for violations by British colonial government 
In 2017, a consortium from the Kipsigis community organised by Professor Paul Kiprono Chepkwony and led by Karim Ahmad Khan sought redress for human rights violations committed by the British government during the colonial period. The plaintiffs were more than 100,000 ethnic Kipsigis victims and the members of Talai Clan.

 Provisions for Oorgoiik 
The Talai clansmen returned or continued to peacefully live with Kipsigis people after independence. After the 
campaign of AIM and Catholic church the Talai clansmen were sidelined and hated but today, they exist peacefully with the Kipsigis and take upon the identity of the Kipsigis equally like any other clansmen. Notably, the residents of Chepalungu constituency (today's Sotik and Chepalungu constituencies) voted in Tamason Barmalel, the grandson of Koitalel Arap Samoei, as their MP between 1969 and 1974.

Allocations of land made by the Kenyan Government under Taaita Towet and Daniel arap Moi to the Talai clansmen has been reported to be grabbed and commercialised by corrupt agents and thus, those living in Kericho live in wanting situations and poverty.

 Conflicts and Violence 
While fairly known for a disposition to be welcoming and hospitable, the Kipsigis are also infamous in Kenya for having participated or led offensive stance during some of Kenya's ethnic violence where in some, ethnic cleansing was a characteristic. The overarching cause for this violence has primarily been discrimantory politics, land contentions and incitment. The Kipsigis amass into the Kalenjin group which in totality portray a united political alliance thus making them subject to discrimanation and incitement. Secondary intrinsic factors for violence machinate through a condition of sinuosity jumbled up between historical injustices, conceitedness from historical precolonial war efforts and demographics where unemployment is rife among the youth and a majority of the population is disdavantaged and disenfrachised economically.

After a comprehensive risk assessment of social, economic and political factors that increase the likelihood of genocide in Kenya, the Sentinel Project for Genocide Prevention's May 2011 report identified several risk factors including; a low degree of democracy, isolation from the international community, high levels of military expenditure, severe government discrimination or active repression of native groups, socioeconomic deprivation combined with group-based inequality and a legacy of intergroup hatred among other risk factors.

 1992 Skirmishes 
In 1992, a series of events contributed to a feeling of uncertainty in Kenya, these events included widespread charges of government corruption that had brought halts or cuts in the flow of foreign aid upon which Kenya's economy depended on, and protests against the government of President Daniel arap Moi that resulted in police attacks on demonstrators. Forby, under diplomatic pressure, the KANU regime under Daniel Toroitich Arap Moi caved to the political demand and need for multi-party democracy. Prior to 1992 elections, because of their support for the nascent opposition, KANU affiliates incited Kalenjin against Kikuyu around the idea that Kikuyu were non-indigenous and had appropriated Kalenjin land.  As a result, ethnic cleaning campaigns before during and after the 1992 general elections erupted in a bid out of spite for the out-group and phobia for the tribal claim on land.  According to some accounts 779 people were killed and about 56,000 displaced.

 2008 Post-elections Violence 
In January and February 2008, following the 2007 Kenyan general elections, post-election violence spontaneously erupted throughout the country but in the Rift Valley province; the violence span out and evolved from acts of riots and protests to all out violence against the Kisii and Kikuyu communities who were affiliated to the President Mwai Kibaki's PNU party. A characteristic of the violence it seemed was to expel the out-groups but not necessarily to kill. There was also looting of businesses and firms run by the out-groups as well as on some government properties. The pattern of violence subsequently showed planning and organization by politicians, businessmen, village leaders and local leaders, who enlisted criminal gangs to execute the violence. This was particularly the case in Rift Valley and Nairobi. In Naivasha, Nakuru and the slum areas of Nairobi, Kikuyu gangs were mobilized and used to unleash violence against Luos, Luhyas and Kalenjins, and to expel them from their rented residences. In many instances the police action added to the violence, with considerable evidence that officers took sides and used terror tactics against slum dwellers. In some instances, sexual violence took the form of individual and gang rapes and female and male genital mutilation.

 2018 Maa-Kipsigis skirmishes 
The Maasai and the Kipsigis have historically and traditionally antagonised each other right from and a period earlier than the Maasai era. This usually manifested as cattle raids, eventual battles and the subsequent southward thwarting and ejection of the Maasai. After Kenya's independence, there have been periodic tensions between the Maasai and the Kipsigis which have backgrounds in history and traditions and fuelled by political incitement especially during the elections period. Politicians have been said to fuel the clashes with their remarks, both in public forums and on social media. In 2018 for instance, Narok County Senator Ledama Olekina, part of the Maasai community, has been criticised for remarks about the evictions.

In 2018 particularly, the Uhuru government under the Minister of Lands evicted a section of the Mau Complex settlers who are mainly of Kipsigis ethnicity. The evictions were particularly forceful, inconsiderate, inhuman and without compensation. A major section of the Maasai leaders supported the evictions and are said or known to have committed hate speech. In the wake of the polarisation, the Maasai are reported to have attacked Kipsigis evictees and in retaliation, Kipsigis men in Narok and Bomet counties retaliated. The battles implored the use of crude or/and traditional weaponry including nuts (a nut used to fit to a screw fitted onto a wooden handle about a foot and a half long), spears, bows and arrows, swords and torches (or at least, petrol/gasoline and lighters).

Following the 2018 evictions and Maasai-Kipsigis clashes, several human-rights defenders came together to file a paper in protest of the human-rights violations committed by the Kenyan government in evicting people from the forests; it said in part, "The actions of the Government of Kenya in forcibly evicting tens of thousands of people from forests violates a range of human rights, which are contained in international instruments to which Kenya is a State Party." Kenyan lawyer Leonard Sigey Bett filed a petition with the International Criminal Court at The Hague in the Netherlands challenging the evictions. Environmental conservation groups generally support the eviction of people from the forest, but only if the exercise is done amicably and humanely.

References

 Bibliography 
 A. C. Hollis. The Nandi: Their Language and Folklore. Clarendon Press: Oxford 1909.
 Ember and Ember. Cultural Anthropology''. Pearson Prentice Hall Press: New Jersey 2007.
Kosibon, Elijah Kipngetich (2018). An Oral Narrative about Kapchebereek Clan Among the Kipsigis People of Kenya to His Son Dr. Festus Kipkorir Ngetich. Unpublished.
Burnette C. Fish and Gerald W. Fish: The Kalenjin Heritage; Traditional Religious and Social Practices: World Gospel Mission and William Carey Library. 1995, 1996.
Manners, Robert A. The Kipsigis of Kenya: Culture Change in a 'model' East African Tribe. In Three African Tribes in Transition. Urbana, Illinois: University of Illinois Press, 1950.
Mwanzi, Henry A. A History of the Kipsigis. Nairobi: East African Literature Bureau, 1977
Ochardson, Ian Q. "Supernatural Beliefs of the Lumbwa." Political Record DC/KER/3/1. District Commissioner's Office, Kericho: 1918.

External links

 
Kalenjin
Ethnic groups in Kenya
Nilotic peoples